The 2022 Vocotruyen World Championships was the 3rd Vietnamese Traditional Martial Arts World Championship, held in Algiers, Algeria, from 16–21 July 2022, in the Oval Arena.

Medal summary

Men's events

Women's events

Technical Events
HUY CHUONG NOI DUNG QUYEN QUY DINH

HUY CHUONG NOI DUNG BAI TY CHON

HUY CHUONG NOI DUNG BAI TAP THE

HUY CHUONG NOI DUNG BAI DOI LUYEN

HUY CHUONG NOI DUNG BAI DUONG SINH

Medal table
Source:

References

Martial arts competitions